Buxton Lamas was a railway station in Buxton with Lamas, Norfolk. It was located near the Bure Valley Railway's present Buxton station.

References

Disused railway stations in Norfolk
Former Great Eastern Railway stations
Railway stations in Great Britain opened in 1879
Railway stations in Great Britain closed in 1952